Casually Dressed & Deep in Conversation is the debut studio album by Welsh rock band Funeral for a Friend. It was released on 13 October 2003 through Atlantic Records and was produced by Colin Richardson with co-production by the band themselves. The cover of the album as well as its subsequent singles is based on a small series of paintings by Belgian artist René Magritte titled: "The Lovers".

Upon its release the album received positive reception from critics and was a commercial success. The album was included on NME's album of the year list for 2003, and Rock Sound's 101 Modern Classics list. debuted at number 12 on the UK charts and achieved Gold certifications after a sales of 100,000 a year after its release on 29 October 2004.

Background
The album featured newly recorded versions of "Red is the New Black" and "Juno" (renamed "Juneau") from their "Between Order And Model" EP.

It also features remastered versions of "She Drove Me To Daytime Television" and "Escape Artists Never Die" from Four Ways To Scream Your Name (the latter is slightly remixed).

"Waking Up" was a largely rewritten version of "Summer's Dead and Buried", which was one of the band's earliest songs. "Storytelling" had previously been recorded in studio after Between Order And Model came out. The band liked this demo, but this version hadn't been released at the time (it can be found on the "Between Order And Model" 10th anniversary edition, as well as the out of print Digital 3CD edition of Your History Is Mine). "Moments Forever Faded" was also previously demoed (featured on the 3CD Digital edition of 'Your History Is Mine).

"Rookie of the Year" was featured on the soundtracks of WWE WrestleMania 21 and Burnout 3: Takedown. "Red Is The New Black" was used in the Torchwood episode "They Keep Killing Suzie".

Release
In 2012 the band released a live album titled Casually Dressed and Deep in Conversation: Live and in Full at Shepherds Bush Empire. The live album was recorded at the Shepherd's Bush Empire in London in July 2010. The live performance's setlist featured the debut album in its entirety, plus additional tracks from other albums in its encore. The album was announced in January 2011, with no tentative release date announced but a teaser trailer was posted. The live recording featured guitarist Darran Smith before he left the band in late 2010. He was replaced by Richard Boucher, who was a member of hardcore punk band Hondo Maclean. The album was released in early April 2012 and was made available through the band's online store to purchase. To celebrate the 10th anniversary of the album, it was repressed on double white 180g vinyl as a limited edition release for Record Store Day 2013.

Reception

The album received very positive reviews from the British music press upon its release. With NME writer Dan Martin gave the album at 8 out of 10 and praised the album quite considerably calling it a "fearsome debut" and stating that: "It would be unfair on everyone else to call 'Casually Dressed and Deep in Conversation' the first great album to come out of all this. But what is true is that this fiery, dynamic hulk of a record will be the first to break properly out into daylight." It was also featured at number 17 in New Musical Express's albums of the year list for 2003.

In 2012, British publication Rock Sound added Casually Dressed & Deep in Conversation into their "101 Modern Classics", placed at number 33, between Lamb of God's As the Palaces Burn and Glassjaw's Worship and Tribute, stating that "‘Casually Dressed…’ evidences a remarkable young band who, on their debut full-length release, were already the finished article, establishing a sound that continues to define an entire generation."

Track listing

Personnel 
Funeral for a Friend
Gareth Davies - bass, backing vocals
Kris Roberts – guitars
Matt Davies – lead vocals
Ryan Richards – drums, screamed vocals
Darran Smith – guitars
Production credits
Written and performed by Funeral for a Friend
Produced and mixed by Colin Richardson
Co-produced by Funeral for a Friend
Recorded at Chapel Studios, Rak Studios and Miloco Studios (London)
Engineered by Colin Richardson with Matt Hyde, Will Bartle and Richard Woodcraft
Mastered by Howie Weinberg at Masterdisc
Managed by Craig Jennings and Rod Smallwood for Sanctuary Artist Management
Assisted management by Paul Dando
Booking by Jeremy Holgersen for the Agency Group
A&R by Joel De'Ath
Photography by Chris Dunlop
Live photography by Anna Gudaniec and George Davison
Art design by Barny Bewick for Indium Design, inspired by René Magritte

Singles

Charts and certifications

References

2003 debut albums
Funeral for a Friend albums
Atlantic Records albums
Ferret Music albums
Albums produced by Colin Richardson